Anjelika Washington (born May 15, 1998) is an American actress known for her work as Fareeda in the Netflix movie Tall Girl and Beth Chapel / Doctor Mid-Nite in the DC Universe series Stargirl.

Early life 
Washington was born and raised in California.

Career
Washington received considerable acclaim for her role as Fareeda in the Netflix movie Tall Girl. Washington also appeared as Gloria in the ATTN online show Girls Room.

Filmography

Film

Television

References

External links

Living people
American television actresses
21st-century American actresses
African-American actresses
1998 births
21st-century African-American women
21st-century African-American people